Shuwaikh Industrial Area is an area of Kuwait City in Kuwait. It comprises three separate districts: Shuwaikh Industrial-1, Shuwaikh Industrial-2, and Shuwaikh Industrial-3. The industrial area is also located nearby to Shuwaikh proper, Shuwaikh Port, Shuwaikh Commercial Area, Shuwaikh Educational Area and Shuwaikh Health Area; all of which form their own census-designated districts.

See also
Shuwaikh Port
Shuwaikh proper

References

Suburbs of Kuwait City